Major General Martin Linn Smith,  (born 30 July 1962) is a former senior Royal Marines officer who served as Commandant General Royal Marines from 2014 to 2016. He was previously commander of 3 Commando Brigade, and before that Commanding Officer of 30 Commando Information Exploitation Group and Deputy Commander of 3 Commando Brigade. Smith is currently a non-executive adviser of Texo Group.

Early life
Smith was born on 30 July 1962 in Pembury, Kent, England. He was educated at Sevenoaks School, a private school in Sevenoaks, Kent: originally an all-boys school, it became co-educational when girls were admitted from 1976. He studied zoology at the University of Bristol, graduating with a Bachelor of Science (BSc) degree.

Military career

Smith was commissioned into the Royal Marines in May 1984. During his early career, he served as a troop commander, a forward air controller, a mortar troop commander and a special forces officer in the Special Boat Service. He completed postings to Northern Ireland during The Troubles, and to Norway. He went on to specialise in reconnaissance and was deployed as part of the Gulf War in 1991.

In 1995, he attended the Royal Navy Staff Course and completed a Master of Arts (MA) degree in defence studies. From 1996 to 1997, he served as a staff officer specialising in operations. He then joined Headquarters Royal Marines where he served as Staff Officer to the Chief of Staff. In the 1998 Queen's Birthday Honours, he was appointed a Member of the Order of the British Empire (MBE). From 2000 to 2001, he worked at the Permanent Joint Headquarters within its Operations Division.

Following the 9/11 terrorist attacks, he was posted to the United States as part of the initial UK advisory team attached to the United States Central Command. In November 2001, he was appointed Second in Command of 45 Commando. With them, he deployed to Afghanistan and took part in Operation Jacana in 2002. With the start of the Iraq War, he was posted to the multinational headquarters as Deputy Chief of Operations.

Smith was appointed Commanding Officer of 30 Commando Information Exploitation Group. In August 2006, he joined FLEET Operations as head of plans. In July 2008, he was appointed Deputy Commander of 3 Commando Brigade. He was deployed to Afghanistan where he served as Commander Battle Group
Centre South during Op HERRICK 9. In 2011, he was appointed commander of 3 Commando Brigade. In June 2013, he left to study at the Royal College of Defence Studies.

Smith was promoted to major general and appointed Commandant General Royal Marines on 13 June 2014, in succession to Major General Ed Davis. Smith was posted as a deputy adviser to the Afghanistan Ministry of Interior ('MOI') in June 2016.

Smith was appointed Companion of the Order of the Bath (CB) in the 2017 New Year Honours.

References

1962 births
20th-century Royal Marines personnel
21st-century Royal Marines personnel
Graduates of the Royal College of Defence Studies
Alumni of the University of Bristol
British military personnel of The Troubles (Northern Ireland)
Graduates of the Royal Naval College, Greenwich
Living people
Members of the Order of the British Empire
Royal Marines generals
Royal Navy personnel of the Gulf War
Royal Navy personnel of the Iraq War
Royal Navy personnel of the War in Afghanistan (2001–2021)
Companions of the Order of the Bath
People from Pembury
People educated at Sevenoaks School
Military personnel from Kent
Deputy Lieutenants of Angus